The Death of Grass (US title No Blade of Grass) is a 1956 post-apocalyptic science fiction novel written by the English author Sam Youd under the pen name John Christopher. The plot concerns a virus that kills off grass species, including rice and wheat. The Death of Grass was the first of several post-apocalyptic novels written by Youd. The novel was written in a matter of weeks and liberated him from his day job.

It was published in the United States both in book form and serialized in The Saturday Evening Post, as No Blade of Grass; supposedly the US publisher thought the original title "sounded like something out of a gardening catalogue". Its publication in The Saturday Evening Post provoked considerable reaction amongst its readers on account of its portrayal of government's response to the unfolding worldwide crisis. The film rights were sold to MGM; the 1970 film, No Blade of Grass, was produced and directed by Cornel Wilde.

Plot
A new virus strain has infected rice crops in East Asia causing massive famine; the virus is also revealed to be found in the UK but because of its selectivity does not affect the country's agriculture. After the introduction of a new pesticide, developed in preference to breeding resistant crops, a mutated virus appears and infects the staple crops of West Asia and Europe such as wheat and barley—all of the grasses (thus the novel's title). It threatens a famine engulfing the whole of the Old World, while Australasia and the Americas attempt to impose rigorous quarantine to keep the virus out.

The novel follows the struggles of engineer John Custance and his friend, civil servant Roger Buckley, as, along with their families, they make their way across an England which is rapidly descending into anarchy, hoping to reach the safety of John's brother's potato farm in an isolated Westmorland valley. Buckley, having advance warning of the government's plot to hydrogen bomb major cities, alerts Custance to evacuate. Picking up a travelling companion in a gun shop owner named Pirrie after an attempt to procure arms, they find they must sacrifice many of their morals in order to stay alive. At one point, when their food supply runs out, they kill a family to take their bread. The protagonist justifies this with the belief that "it was them or us."

By the time they reach the valley, they have accumulated a considerable entourage as a result of their encounters with other groups of survivors along the way. They find that John's brother is unable to let them all in to the heavily defended valley. Pirrie prevents John from taking only his immediate family into the valley; instead, the group takes the valley by force. Pirrie and John's brother are killed; John takes possession of the valley.

Adaptations
A dramatised version was broadcast on BBC radio in the late 1950s.

A film adaptation, No Blade of Grass (1970), was produced and directed by Cornel Wilde. 

In 2009, as part of a BBC Radio 4 science fiction season, the station broadcast a drama in five episodes, based on the novel and narrated by David Mitchell.

In popular culture
In the 2017 television series Feud, Joan Crawford (played by Jessica Lange) is portrayed rejecting the book as a possible movie source.

References

1956 British novels
1956 science fiction novels
British science fiction novels
British post-apocalyptic novels
Books about famine
Novels by John Christopher
Works published under a pseudonym
Novels about viral outbreaks
British novels adapted into films
Michael Joseph books